Welsh, a Brythonic Celtic language, was historically spoken by the majority of Wales' population, with current estimates suggesting a third of the current population of Wales speak the language.

Graphical summary 1750-1900

Prior to the census 
 1801: about 80% (Population: 587,000, so approx. 470,000 Welsh speakers)
 1851: about 67% (Population: 1,163,000, so approx. 779,000 Welsh speakers)

Census 

*largest population of Welsh speakers ever recorded in a census

**largest proportion of Welsh speakers ever recorded in a census

N/A: not applicable

Census figures denote those able to speak Welsh above the age of 3 years old.

Annual Population Surveys 

N/A: not applicable

Annual population survey figures indicate the number of people over the age of three years able to speak Welsh. The number of speakers has been estimated based on the percentage of the population that speak Welsh and the general population size provided by the APS.

Welsh medium education

Primary education 

*More than half of curriculum teaching is through the medium of Welsh

Secondary education

See also

Welsh language 
Welsh language
History of the Welsh language
Welsh-language literature
Welsh Language Society
Welsh Language Commissioner

Other 
Celtic languages
Status of the Irish language
Scottish Gaelic#Distribution in Scotland
Cornish language
Celtic language decline in England
List of European languages by number of speakers

References 

Welsh language
History of Wales